Boss for Leader is the third full-length studio album by the Swedish synthpop group Slagsmålsklubben, released in 2007 by EMI. It is the follow-up to the 2004 album Sagan om konungens årsinkomst.

Track listing
 "Hänt" – 4:06 (Happened)
 "Sponsored by Destiny" – 6:01 (The song "Sponsored by Destiny" ends at minute 5:10. After 5 seconds of silence (5:10 - 5:15) begins a hidden track).
 "Speedboats" – 3:55
 "The World Welcomes Fame" – 5:29
 "Malmö Beach Night Party" – 4:06
 "Dysparennia" – 3:52
 "Spanska Förhoppningar" – 3:14 (Spanish Expectations)
 "Han Som Tuggar Med Öppen Mun Dör" – 4:50 (He Who Chews with His Mouth Open Dies)
 "Borg of Hate" – 5:45 (Castle of Hate)
 "Pälsmästaren" – 13:38 (The Fur Master)
 "Vidrige Ajjabajja" – 2:55 (Repulsing Ajjabajja; special edition bonus track)

2007 albums
Slagsmålsklubben albums